A vallum is the whole or a portion of the fortifications of a Roman camp.

Vallum may also refer to:

 Vallum (anatomy), a portion of the human tongue
 Vallum (Hadrian's Wall), a huge earthwork which runs from coast to coast to the south of Hadrian's Wall

See also

 Valium
 Vellum